Richard Lee Petty (born July 2, 1937), nicknamed "The King", is an American former stock car racing driver who raced from 1958 to 1992 in the former NASCAR Grand National and Winston Cup Series (now called the NASCAR Cup Series), most notably driving the No. 43 Plymouth/Pontiac for Petty Enterprises. He was the first driver to win the Cup Series championship seven times (a record now tied with Dale Earnhardt and Jimmie Johnson), while also winning a record 200 races during his career. This included winning the Daytona 500 a record seven times and winning a record 27 races in one season (1967).

He earns broad respect in motorsport as, statistically, the most accomplished driver in the history of NASCAR, where he remains very active as both a team owner (GMS Racing) in the Cup Series and owner of Petty's Garage (a car restoration and modification shop) in Level Cross, North Carolina.

During his 35-year career, Petty collected a record number of poles (123) and over 700 top 10 finishes in a record 1,184 starts, including 513 consecutive starts from 1971 to 1989. Petty was the first driver to win in his 500th race start, being joined by Matt Kenseth in 2013. He was inducted into the inaugural class of the NASCAR Hall of Fame in 2010.

The Richard Petty Museum was formerly in nearby Randleman, North Carolina, but moved back to its original location in Level Cross in March 2014.

Petty has also voiced a role in Disney's animated films Cars and Cars 3, playing The King, a character partially based on himself who is looking forward to winning his last race before retirement.

Personal life 
Petty is a second-generation driver. His father, Lee Petty, won the first Daytona 500 in 1959 and was also a three-time NASCAR champion.

In 1958 Petty married Lynda Owens, who would die of cancer on March 25, 2014, at her home in Level Cross, North Carolina at age 72. They had four children, including Kyle Petty. The family resides in Petty's home town of Level Cross, North Carolina.

Petty's son Kyle was also a NASCAR driver. His grandson, Adam (Kyle's son), was killed in a practice crash at New Hampshire Motor Speedway on May 12, 2000, five weeks after the death of Lee Petty. Adam's brother Austin is Emeritus Chairman and Founder of Victory Junction, a SeriousFun Children's Network camp established by the Pettys after Adam's death.

Racing career 

Petty was born in Level Cross, North Carolina, the son of Elizabeth Petty (née Toomes) and Lee Arnold Petty, also a NASCAR driver, and the older brother of NASCAR personality Maurice Petty. He was educated in Randleman, North Carolina and attended Randleman High School, where he was an All-Conference guard on the football team. After his 1955 graduation, he took a business course at Greensboro Junior College, then began work for his father's racing company, Petty Enterprises. He began his NASCAR career on July 18, 1958, 16 days after his 21st birthday. His first race was held at CNE Stadium in Toronto, Ontario, Canada (the site of BMO Field and the Honda Indy Toronto currently). In 1959, he was named NASCAR Rookie of the Year, after he produced 9 top 10 finishes, including six Top 5 finishes. That year, he had participated in the inaugural Daytona 500 at the new Daytona International Speedway, but after his day ended due to engine trouble, he joined his father Lee's pit crew, who won the race. In Lakewood, Georgia in 1959, Petty won his first race, but his father Lee protested, complaining of a scoring error on the officials' part. Hours later, Lee was awarded the win.

The 1960s 

In 1960, he finished 2nd in the NASCAR Grand National Points Race, and got his first career win at the Charlotte Fairgrounds Speedway. 1963 was his breakout year, winning at tracks like Martinsville and Bridgehampton. In 1964, driving a potent Plymouth with a new Hemi engine, Petty led 184 of the 200 laps to capture his first Daytona 500, en route to 9 victories, earning over $114,000 and his first Grand National championship.

Joining in the Chrysler boycott of NASCAR due to the organizing body's ban of the Hemi engine, Petty spent much of 1965 competing as a drag racer. Petty Enterprises installed the Hemi in the new compact Barracuda and lettered "OUTLAWED" on the door. He crashed this car at Southeastern Dragway, in Dallas, Georgia, on February 28, 1965, killing an eight-year-old boy and injuring seven others. Petty, his father Lee, and Chrysler Corporation faced lawsuits totaling more than $1 million, though Petty and his team came to settlements with the lawsuits within 1 month of the suits being filed. Afterwards, a second Hemi Barracuda was built, this time with an altered wheelbase and eventually with Hilborn fuel injection. This car was lettered with a large "43 JR" on the door. The car was very successful, winning its class at the Bristol Spring Nationals and competing in many match races against well-known racers such as Ronnie Sox, Don Nicholson, Phil Bonner, Huston Platt, Hubert Platt and Dave Strickler. Even after returning to NASCAR once the Hemi was reinstated, Richard continued drag racing the 43 JR until early 1966.
±
On February 27, 1966, Richard Petty overcame a 2-lap deficit to win his second Daytona 500 when the race was stopped on lap 198 of 200 because of a thunderstorm. This made him the first driver to win the event twice. In 1966, he won the first ever race at Middle Georgia Raceway (Morelock 200). Petty broke the half-mile NASCAR record for half-mile tracks with an average speed of 82.023 miles per hour during the 100-mile (160 km) event. He would end up recording 4 wins there in his career, including one in 1970 in which he was very ill before the race. 1967 was a milestone year. In that year, Petty won 27 of the 48 races he entered, including a record 10 wins in a row (between August 12 and October 1, 1967). He won his second Grand National Championship. One of the 27 victories was the Southern 500 at Darlington, which would be his only Southern 500 victory. His dominance in this season earned him the nickname "King Richard". He had previously been known as "the Randleman Rocket".

In 1968, Petty won 16 races including the last ever race at Occoneechee Speedway.

In 1969 Ford significantly ratcheted up their factory involvement in NASCAR when they introduced the Ford Torino Talladega. The Talladega was specifically designed to give Ford a competitive race advantage by being more aerodynamic and thus faster, especially on super-speedway tracks more than a mile long. Petty switched brands to Ford, due to his belief the Plymouth was not competitive on super-speedways; he wanted a slippery Dodge Daytona but Chrysler executives insisted he stay with Plymouth. He would win 10 races and finish second in points. Won back in 1970 by the sleek new Plymouth Superbird with shark nose and towel rack wing, Petty returned to Plymouth for the 1970 season. This is the car in which Petty is cast in the Pixar film Cars (2006), in which Richard and Lynda Petty had voice roles.

The 1970s 

On February 14, 1971, Petty won his third Daytona 500, driving a brand-new (for 1971) Plymouth Road Runner and beating Buddy Baker, by little more than a car length en route to another historic year, making him the first driver to win the race 3 times. He won 20 more races (which would make him become the first driver to earn more than $1 million in career earnings) and claimed his 3rd Grand National Championship. At the end of the 1971 season, Chrysler told the Pettys they no longer would receive direct factory funding support; this gave the Petty team great concern. In 1972, STP began what would turn into a successful 28-year sponsorship arrangement with Petty, however, it marked the end of his famous all "Petty Blue" paint job. STP previously insisted on an all STP orangish-red color for the cars, but Petty balked and after an all-night negotiation session, the familiar STP orange/"Petty blue" paint scheme was agreed to as a compromise that would later become part of STP's motorsport paint schemes, most notably Gordon Johncock's win in the 1982 Indianapolis 500 (where the car had a primarily "Petty Blue" scheme). Thanks to his 28 Top 10 finishes (25 Top 5 finishes and 8 victories), Petty went on to win his 4th NASCAR Cup Series championship. 1972 was a year of change in other ways, as it was the last year where Petty would campaign a Plymouth-based race car; as in the middle of the year, he debuted to drive a newly built 1972 Dodge Charger in a few races (winning one of them), as he believed that the car would have a slight aero advantage over the Plymouth body style. In a driver's duel on February 18, 1973, Petty, in a newly built 1973 Dodge Charger (a body style he would use exclusively until the end of 1977), outlasted Baker (now with the K&K Insurance Dodge race team) to win his 4th Daytona 500 after Baker's engine gave out with 6 laps to go. A year later, Petty won the Daytona "450" (shortened 20 laps {50 mi/80 km} due to the energy crisis) for the fifth time en route to his 5th Winston Cup Championship.

1975 was another historic year for Petty, as he won the World 600 for the first time in his career, one of 13 victories en route to his 6th Winston Cup. The 13 victories is a modern (1972–present) NASCAR record for victories in a season and was tied in 1998 by Jeff Gordon, although Gordon won 13 out of 33 races, compared to Petty's 13 out of 30 races. In 1976, Petty was involved in one of the most famous finishes in NASCAR history. Petty and David Pearson were racing on the last lap out of turn 4 in the Daytona 500. As Petty tried to pass Pearson, at the exit of turn 4, Petty's right rear bumper hit Pearson's left front bumper. Pearson and Petty both spun and hit the front stretch wall. Petty's car came to rest just yards from the finish line, but his engine stalled. Pearson's car had hit the front stretch wall and clipped another car, but his engine was running. Members of Petty's pit crew came out onto the track and tried to push the car to the finish line, but ultimately failed. Pearson was able to drive his car toward the finish line, while Petty's car would not restart. Pearson passed Petty on the infield grass and won the Daytona 500. Petty was given credit for second place.

Oddly 1978 will stand out as the one year during his prime that Petty did not visit the winner's circle. The Petty Enterprises Team could not get the new 1978 Dodge Magnum to handle properly, even though much time, effort, and faith were spent massaging the cars. Unhappy with the seven top-five and eleven top-ten finishes (including three-second places), Petty decided that his longtime relationship with Chrysler could not continue and he instead began racing a secondhand 1974 Chevrolet Monte Carlo at the fall race at Michigan. Returning to the General Motors fold proved successful as Petty recorded six top-ten finishes in the final ten races of the 1978 season and finished sixth in the final standings. He would go on to even better results in 1979. Petty won the Daytona 500 in an Oldsmobile Cutlass Supreme in the "Famous Finish" and ran most of the remaining races in a Chevrolet, winning four additional races and taking the NASCAR championship for the seventh, and last, time by 11 points which was the closest points margin in NASCAR history until 1992.

Twilight years (1980–1991) 

Petty won two more Daytona 500s in 1979 and 1981. In 1979, he snapped a 45-race drought, winning his sixth Daytona 500, the first to be televised live flag-to-flag; it would become notorious for a fistfight between competitors following the controversial finish. Petty won the race as the first and second place cars of Donnie Allison and Cale Yarborough crashed on the last lap. Petty held off Darrell Waltrip and A. J. Foyt. The race is also regarded as being the genesis of the current surge in NASCAR's popularity. The East Coast was snowed in by a blizzard, giving CBS a captive audience. The win was part of Petty's seventh and last NASCAR Winston Cup Championship. He was able to hold off Waltrip to win the title in 1979.

in 1980 Petty won two races early in the year at North Wilkesboro and Nashville but a violent crash at Pocono in July ended his championship hopes. He finished 4th in points

For 1981, NASCAR dictated that all teams had to show up with the new downsized cars of 110" wheel-base, that Detroit had been building since 1979. Though Petty had been successful with the Chevrolet and Oldsmobile cars he had been running, he wanted to get back to his Mopar roots. After taking a phone call from Lee Iacocca (who personally asked Petty to campaign a Dodge for 1981), the Petty team built a stunning 1981 Dodge Mirada and took it to Daytona in January 1981 for high speed tests. Petty's fans were also in a large part fans of his Dodges, so when word got out about the Mirada testing, 15,000 or so showed up on January 17, 1981, at Daytona Speedway to watch Petty put the Dodge through its paces. Sadly for the fans, the car could do no better than 186 miles per hour, about eight miles per hour slower than the GM and Ford cars. Petty gave up on returning to Dodge knowing that for the superspeedways the Mirada would not be competitive, and bought a Buick Regal for the Daytona race. In the 1981 Daytona 500, Petty used a "fuel only" for his last pit stop, with 25 laps to go, to outfox Bobby Allison and grab his seventh and final Daytona 500 win. This win marked a large change in Petty's racing team. Dale Inman, Petty's longtime crew chief, left the team after the Daytona victory (Inman would win an eighth championship as crew chief in 1984 with Terry Labonte).

While the 1981 season gave Petty 3 wins, he felt the season was a failure, and the Regals being ill-handling and poor in reliability. For 1982, he made the move to the Pontiac Grand Prix, with the promise of substantial factory support from Pontiac. 1982 was a repeat of 1978, and no victories were to be had. At first, the Grand Prix behaved much like the Dodge Magnum of 1978, with handling and speed problems. Toward the end of 1982 things improved with several top-10 finishes, which opened the door to a successful 1983 season with three victories, and several top-5 and top-10 finishes. In 1983, he broke his 43-race winless streak from 1982 with a win in the 1983 Carolina 500, barely edging out a young Bill Elliott. After a controversial win at Charlotte in October 1983 (recognised by NASCAR as win No. 198), Petty left the race team his father founded for the 1984 season. He spent '84 and '85 driving for Mike Curb before returning to Petty Enterprises in 1986.

Because of the 1971 Myers Brothers 250 combination race in 1971 that Petty finished second in a Grand National Car while winner Bobby Allison drove a Grand American car, there is a technical dispute regarding which race is credited as his 200th win.  NASCAR did not credit Petty with a class win, which was a dispute that affected two other drivers, Elmo Langley and Charlie Glotzbach, both of whom drove in combination races that season, finishing second to Grand American cars.  Under modern NASCAR combination race rules for various series, Petty would be credited with that would be recognized as his 135th win. On May 20, 1984, Petty won what under modern regulations would be recognized as his 200th Cup class win, the Budweiser 500 at Dover International Speedway, when the Winston-Salem class win is recognized.

On July 4, 1984, Petty won his officially-recognized 200th (and what would turn out to be his final victory) race at the Firecracker 400 at Daytona International Speedway. The race was memorable: On lap 158, Doug Heveron crashed, bringing out the yellow caution flag, essentially turning lap 158 into the last lap as the two drivers battled back to the start-finish line. Petty and Cale Yarborough diced it out on that lap, with Yarborough drafting and taking an early lead before Petty managed to cross the start/finish line only a fender-length ahead. (This is no longer possible because of the 2003 rule change freezing the field immediately upon caution. Furthermore, in 2004 the green-white-checkered rule was created for cases when the yellow flag waved with two laps, but not just one, remaining. Also, under current combination race rules, Petty would be recognized for his 201st win.) President Ronald Reagan was in attendance, the first sitting president to attend a NASCAR race. Reagan celebrated the milestone with Petty and his family in victory lane.

In early 1988, Petty traveled to Australia to help promote a NASCAR exhibition race at the then new Calder Park Thunderdome, the first NASCAR race outside of North America. While he did not compete in the track's inaugural race, the Goodyear NASCAR 500 (though his son Kyle did), Richard Petty, in testing at the 1.119 mi (1.801 km) track which owner Bob Jane had modeled on the Charlotte Motor Speedway, set an unofficial lap record of 28.2 seconds (142.85 mp/h). This would have in fact landed him on pole position for the race, as the fastest time in official qualifying was by Alabama Gang member Neil Bonnett, who recorded a 28.829-second lap (139.734 mp/h) in his Pontiac Grand Prix.

Petty's last ride (1992) 

On October 1, 1991, Petty announced he would retire after the 1992 season. Petty's final top ten finish came at the 1991 Budweiser at the Glen which was the same race J. D. McDuffie was killed in a fifth lap accident. Petty chose to run the entire 1992 season, not just selected events as other drivers have done before retirement. His year-long Fan Appreciation Tour took him around the country, participating in special events, awards ceremonies, and fan-related meetings. Racing Champions ran a promotional line of diecast cars for every race in Petty's Farewell Tour.

At the 1992 Pepsi 400 on July 4, Petty qualified on the front row for the first time since 1986. Before the start of the race, he was honored with a gift ceremony which included a visit from President George H. W. Bush. When the green flag dropped, Petty led the opening five laps as the holiday crowd cheered wildly. Unfortunately, the oppressive heat forced him to drop out after completing just 84 laps.

Despite the busy appearance schedule and mediocre race results, Petty managed to qualify for all 29 races in 1992. On his final visit to each track, Petty would lead the field on the pace lap to salute the fans. Petty's final race, the season-ending Hooters 500 at Atlanta Motor Speedway, which also marked the start of Jeff Gordon's NASCAR career and the second-closest points championship in NASCAR history, with six drivers mathematically eligible to win the championship, is hailed to this day as the greatest race in NASCAR history. A record 160,000 spectators attended the race and celebrated Petty's farewell. In the intense title race, the championship contender, Davey Allison, got mixed up in a crash with Ernie Irvan, dashing his title hopes. Long-shot contenders Mark Martin, Kyle Petty and Harry Gant fell behind in the long run, which left Bill Elliott and Alan Kulwicki to compete for the title. The race went down to the final lap with Elliott winning and Kulwicki taking the championship by 10 points because he had led the most laps, one more than Elliott, which gave him a five-point bonus.

Facing intense pressure, Petty barely managed to qualify at Atlanta, posting the 39th fastest speed out of 41 cars. He would not have been eligible for the provisional starting position, and had to qualify on speed. On the 94th lap, Petty became tangled up in an accident, and his car caught fire. Petty pulled the car off the track, and climbed out of the burning machine uninjured. His pit crew worked diligently with less than 20 laps to go to get the car running again, and with two laps to go, Petty pulled out of the pits and was credited as running at the finish in his final race. He took his final checkered flag, finishing in 35th position. After the race, Petty circled the track to salute the fans one final time in his trademark STP Pontiac.

Thereafter he made a few public show appearances at racetracks. On August 18, 1993, NASCAR participated in a tire test at the Indianapolis Motor Speedway, in preparations for the 1994 Brickyard 400. Petty drove several laps around the track, and then donated his car to the Speedway's museum. He would again step into a racecar in 2003 on the week of the final race under the Winston banner at Homestead-Miami Speedway, where he took a solo lap honoring his seven Winston Cup Championships for Winston's salute to the champions. In 2009 at the Coke Zero 400 in Daytona, for the 25th anniversary of his final, 200th victory in 1984, Petty drove one of his 1980s Pontiac racecars during the pace laps, leading the field for the first one. The field split him and he followed it for one more pace lap before he pulled his car in. Finally, at the 2017 Southern 500 at Darlington, Petty led the field through several pace laps in his Plymouth Belvedere. He apparently stayed out a lap longer than expected and was humorously black flagged by the starter. Petty followed the pace car down pit road at the start of the race.

Petty as an owner 
In later years of his career, Petty developed the career of crew leader Robbie Loomis, who was at the helm of Petty Enterprises as crew chief in the 1990s and won three races—the 1996 Checker Auto Parts 500 at Phoenix, the 1997 ACDelco 400 at North Carolina Speedway, both with Bobby Hamilton driving, and the 1999 Goody's Body Pain 500 at Martinsville Speedway, with John Andretti driving. Petty remained as operating owner until his son Kyle Petty took over day-to-day operations a decade later.

However, in 2008, Kyle Petty was released by Petty Enterprises, and, because of lack of sponsorship, Petty Enterprises was bought out by Gillett-Evernham Motorsports. The name was originally going to stay the same, but when Evernham left the team, it was renamed Richard Petty Motorsports, despite George Gillett continuing to own the majority.

In November 2010, an investment group including Medallion Financial Corp., Douglas G. Bergeron and Petty, signed and closed sale on racing assets of Richard Petty Motorsports. Andrew M. Murstein, president of Medallion, had been seeking a sports investment since 2008 when he formed a special-purpose acquisition company together with Hank Aaron, a Medallion board member, and others.

Petty as a broadcaster 
In 1995, Petty moved to the television broadcast booth, joining CBS as a color commentator.

Sponsorship 
Petty promised his mother not to accept alcohol sponsorship. Therefore, he never collected purses for the Bud Pole Award, and he competed at the Busch Clash only once, in 1980.

Close calls 
As well as his numerous victories, Petty is remembered for three of the many disastrous crashes that he survived:
 In the 1970 Rebel 400 at Darlington, Petty was injured when his Plymouth Road Runner cut a tire and slammed hard into the wall separating the track from the pit area. The car flipped several times before coming to rest on its side. This accident injured Petty's shoulder and helped Bobby Isaac to win the 1970 Grand National Championship. During the accident, Petty's head hit the track pavement several times, a mishap that, along with Joe Weatherly's fatal crash six years earlier, led NASCAR to mandate the installation of the Petty-developed safety net that covers the driver's side window.
 In a 1980 race at Pocono, Petty slammed the Turn 2 wall, nearly flipping the car. He barely escaped breaking his neck in the wreck and kept his injury hidden from NASCAR officials for the ensuing races, knowing that another wreck might kill him. Such a deception is unlikely to happen now because of modern NASCAR rules requiring an official series medical liaison to clear a driver after a crash.
 In the 1988 Daytona 500, on Lap 106, Petty got turned by Phil Barkdoll out of turn 4. Petty's car went aloft, tumbled many times, rode along the catch fence, and hurled parts all over the front stretch at the Daytona International Speedway. After several flips, Petty was t-boned by Brett Bodine before coming to a stop. Petty walked away with no serious injuries, except for temporary sight loss due to excessive g-forces. The crash was similar to the accident suffered by Bobby Allison during the 1987 Winston 500 at Talladega Superspeedway and Carl Edwards's 2009 Talladega crash in that, in all three cases, the racers' cars became airborne after turning sideways and damaged the spectator fencing (though much less in Petty's case). Petty's car became airborne despite the use of the carburetor restrictor plate, which was mandated by NASCAR for races at Talladega Superspeedway and Daytona International Speedway just prior to the start of the 1988 season.

Career awards 

 Petty was inducted into the first class of the NASCAR Hall of Fame on May 23, 2010.
 In 1997, he was inducted into the International Motorsports Hall of Fame.
 He was named one of NASCAR's 50 Greatest Drivers in 1998.
 He was sole stock car representative in the first class inducted into the Motorsports Hall of Fame of America in 1989.
 He was awarded the Medal of Freedom by President George Bush in 1992, the first motorsports athlete ever to be honored with this award.

Politics
In 1978, Petty was elected to the Randolph County Commission as a Republican. In 1980 he endorsed John Connally for the Republican nomination for President. According to Petty, it was a "tossup" between Connally and Ronald Reagan, but he chose Connally "basically on personality. And Connally's been there in Washington a lot of times doing a lot of things. He knows the system better." He was reelected to the county commission in 1982, 1986, and 1990. During his 1992 retirement tour, Petty took a parade lap before every race with the exception of the Southern 500, where Democratic presidential candidate Bill Clinton served as grand marshal. In 1993, Petty formed a political action committee to support Republican candidates. In 1996, he was the Republican nominee for North Carolina Secretary of State, but was defeated by State Senator Elaine Marshall in the general election. Petty was mistakenly seen as a shoo-in, and his campaigning was sporadic. Following his loss, Petty stated, "If I had known I wasn't going to win, I wouldn't have run." In June 2016 he made an appearance on stage with Donald Trump.

Life after racing 

Petty is currently a spokesman for Liberty Medical, Cheerios and the GlaxoSmithKline products Nicorette and Goody's Headache Powder. His portrait was featured on Brawny paper towels during a limited time when the company replaced their image with several "real Brawny men". General Mills created a Petty-themed packaged cereal, "43's," its boxes featuring his image and story. Petty also played himself in the 2008 film Swing Vote, where he commends the film's protagonist by allowing him to briefly drive his famous "43" Plymouth.

For public benefit, Petty and his son Kyle have lent their talent to host "Lifting It Right", an automotive lift safety training DVD produced and distributed by the Automotive Lift Institute (ALI); it is used in high school vocational programs and community colleges. He has recorded public service announcements for Civitan International, a nonprofit organization of which he is a former member. He has also established a summer camp known as "Victory Junction", which is intended to give seriously ill children an outdoors, summer-camp experience and has medical staff on hand around the clock in case of emergencies.

In May 2011, Petty was chosen to be the Grand Marshal for the 2011 STP 400 of the Sprint Cup Series. In public, he is usually seen wearing his trademark sunglasses and a Charlie 1 Horse cowboy hat, with a large snakeskin hat band and a plume of rooster feathers at the front.

After retirement, Petty purchased a 90-acre (36 ha) ranch south of Jackson, Wyoming.

Motorsports career results

NASCAR 
(key) (Bold – Pole position awarded by qualifying time. Italics – Pole position earned by points standings or practice time. * – Most laps led.)

Grand National Series

Winston Cup Series

Daytona 500

International Race of Champions 
(key) (Bold – Pole position. * – Most laps led.)

Film and TV appearances 

 In 2011, Petty was featured in the show Modern HotrodZ. Petty's Garage now builds Custom cars for the general public, most of which are Limited Edition.
 He appeared as himself in the movie Swing Vote driving in his famous blue No. 43 car, and letting Bud drive his car to Air Force One to meet the President.
 Petty voiced Strip Weathers (a fictionalized version of himself), also known as "The King", in the Disney/Pixar animated movie Cars (2006). His car, the Road Runner Superbird with the distinctive "Petty Blue" tint and the number 43, is also the model used for the car in the movie. He is hoping to get one more victory in him before he can retire from racing on the Piston Cup circuit. Though The King's accident caused by his longtime running rival Chick Hicks at the end of the film was a re-creation of Rusty Wallace's real-life Winston 500 accident in 1993, the bit in which rookie racer Lightning McQueen assists him to the finish line is based on the 1976 incident, albeit by the pit crew. Petty's wife Lynda voiced The King's wife, a 1976 Chrysler Town & Country station-wagon (based on Petty's family car), in that movie as well. Petty's character did not appear in Cars 2 (2011), but did return in Cars 3 (2017), in which Petty voiced his character as the crew chief of his nephew and new Dinoco racer Hank/Cal Weathers, who was voiced by driver Kyle Petty, who is Richard Petty's son.
 Petty appeared in the Tom Cruise movie Days of Thunder (1990).
 He appeared in the Burt Reynolds movie Stroker Ace (1983) as himself.
 Petty appeared as himself in the movie 43: The Richard Petty Story (1972) (a Victory Lane Production, released by Video Gems, distributed by United American Video in 1986).
 In 1989, Petty appeared as himself in the movie Speed Zone, driving in his famous blue No. 43 car.
 In 1967, Petty appeared in the opening credits of the Elvis Presley movie Speedway that was shot and filmed at the Charlotte Motor Speedway in Concord, North Carolina. This movie was released in 1968.
 He was in Petty Blue, a documentary by NASCAR.
 Petty guest-starred in the Alley Oop daily comic strip from June 7 to June 20, 1994, in which he drove a pickup truck to help corral an escaped dinosaur (that had been transported to the 20th century).
 Petty appeared as himself in the (1965) Howard Hawks film Red Line 7000

References

External links 

 
 
 Richard Petty Gives a Tour of Petty Enterprises

 
1937 births
Living people
People from Randolph County, North Carolina
Racing drivers from North Carolina
NASCAR Cup Series champions
International Race of Champions drivers
NASCAR team owners
International Motorsports Hall of Fame inductees
Motorsport announcers
American athlete-politicians
County commissioners in North Carolina
North Carolina Republicans
Presidential Medal of Freedom recipients
Petty family
USAC Stock Car drivers
NASCAR Hall of Fame inductees